TSS Mona’s Isle V, the fifth ship in the line's history to bear the name, was a passenger vessel operated by the Isle of Man Steam Packet Company from 1951 to 1980. She was the last of the company's ships to use low pressure turbines.

History

Design

Although she was very like , Mona's Isle could be identified from her by not having the Manx crest on her bows. At the stern, whereas the Snaefell had rails and mesh, Mona's Isle had solid bulwarks.

Service life

Operational career
She started service between Douglas and the various ports then served by the Steam Packet.

On 8 June 1955, she went aground off Fleetwood after a collision with the Ludo, a small fishing vessel. One man, Francis Stewart, was lost from the Ludo which was cut in half and sank almost immediately.

On 15 February 1964, she went aground at Peel and severely damaged her stern resulting in her having to be towed to Birkenhead for repairs.
 
In August 1971, Mona's Isle reopened the Company's Fleetwood service from Douglas, but on 28 August 1974 made its last sailing to Heysham Port.

She appeared in a feature on Nationwide on 24 July 1974.

The 1980 season was her last, although she did appear in the film Chariots of Fire and took the 150th anniversary cruise around the Island. 27 August saw her final passenger sailing from Douglas to Llandudno. She was towed away to Dutch breakers on 30 October 1980.

References

1950 ships
Ships of the Isle of Man Steam Packet Company
Passenger ships of the United Kingdom
Ferries of the Isle of Man
Steamships
Ships built on the River Mersey
Steamships of the United Kingdom
Maritime incidents in 1955